In Riemannian geometry, the sectional curvature is one of the ways to describe the curvature of Riemannian manifolds. The sectional curvature K(σp) depends on a two-dimensional linear subspace σp of the tangent space at a point p of the manifold. It can be defined geometrically as the Gaussian curvature of the surface which has the plane σp as a tangent plane at p, obtained from geodesics which start at p in the directions of σp (in other words, the image of σp under the exponential map at p). The sectional curvature is a real-valued function on the 2-Grassmannian bundle over the manifold.

The sectional curvature determines the curvature tensor completely.

Definition
Given a Riemannian manifold and two linearly independent tangent vectors at the same point, u and v, we can define

Note that the linear independence of u and v forces the denominator in the above expression to be nonzero, so that K(u,v) is well-defined. In particular, if u and v are orthonormal, then the definition takes on the simple form

Alternative definitions
Alternatively, the sectional curvature can be characterized by the circumference of small circles. Then it can be proven that

  

Manifolds with constant sectional curvature
One says that a Riemannian manifold has "constant curvature " if  for all two-dimensional linear subspaces  and for all 

The Schur lemma states that if (M,g) is a connected Riemannian manifold with dimension at least three, and if there is a function  such that  for all two-dimensional linear subspaces  and for all  then f must be constant and hence (M,g) has constant curvature.

A Riemannian manifold with constant sectional curvature is called a space form. If  denotes the constant value of the sectional curvature, then the curvature tensor can be written as
 
for any 

Since any Riemannian metric is parallel with respect to its Levi-Civita connection, this shows that the Riemann tensor of any constant-curvature space is also parallel.

The model examples 

Given a positive number  define
  to be the standard Riemannian structure
  to be the ball  with 
In the usual terminology, these Riemannian manifolds are referred to as Euclidean space, the n-sphere, and hyperbolic space. Here, the point is that each is a complete connected smooth Riemannian manifold with constant curvature. To be precise, the Riemannian metric  has constant curvature 0, the Riemannian metric  has constant curvature  and the Riemannian metric  has constant curvature 

Furthermore, these are the 'universal' examples in the sense that if  is a smooth, connected, and simply-connected complete Riemannian manifold with constant curvature, then it is isometric to one of the above examples; the particular example is dictated by the value of the constant curvature of  according to the constant curvatures of the above examples.

Note that the deck transformations of the universal cover are isometries relative to the metric 

The study of Riemannian manifolds with constant negative curvature, called hyperbolic geometry, is particularly noteworthy as it exhibits many noteworthy phenomena.

Scaling
Let  be a smooth manifold, and let  be a positive number. Consider the Riemannian manifold  The curvature tensor, as a multilinear map  is unchanged by this modification. Then
 
So multiplication of the metric by  multiplies all of the sectional curvatures by

Toponogov's theorem
Toponogov's theorem affords a characterization of sectional curvature in terms of how "fat" geodesic triangles appear when compared to their Euclidean counterparts.  The basic intuition is that, if a space is positively curved, then the edge of a triangle opposite some given vertex will tend to bend away from that vertex, whereas if a space is negatively curved, then the opposite edge of the triangle will tend to bend towards the vertex.

More precisely, let M be a complete Riemannian manifold, and let xyz be a geodesic triangle in M (a triangle each of whose sides is a length-minimizing geodesic).  Finally, let m be the midpoint of the geodesic xy.  If M has non-negative curvature, then for all sufficiently small triangles

where d is the distance function on M.  The case of equality holds precisely when the curvature of M vanishes, and the right-hand side represents the distance from a vertex to the opposite side of a geodesic triangle in Euclidean space having the same side-lengths as the triangle xyz.  This makes precise the sense in which triangles are "fatter" in positively curved spaces.  In non-positively curved spaces, the inequality goes the other way:

If tighter bounds on the sectional curvature are known, then this property generalizes to give a comparison theorem between geodesic triangles in M and those in a suitable simply connected space form; see Toponogov's theorem.  Simple consequences of the version stated here are:

 A complete Riemannian manifold has non-negative sectional curvature if and only if the function  is 1-concave for all points p.
 A complete simply connected Riemannian manifold has non-positive sectional curvature if and only if the function  is 1-convex.

Manifolds with non-positive sectional curvature
In 1928, Élie Cartan proved the Cartan–Hadamard theorem: if M is a complete manifold with non-positive sectional curvature, then its universal cover is diffeomorphic to a Euclidean space. In particular, it is aspherical: the homotopy groups  for i ≥ 2 are trivial.  Therefore, the topological structure of a complete non-positively curved manifold is determined by its fundamental group.  Preissman's theorem restricts the fundamental group of negatively curved compact manifolds. The Cartan–Hadamard conjecture states that the classical isoperimetric inequality should hold in all simply connected spaces of non-positive curvature, which are called Cartan-Hadamard manifolds.

Manifolds with positive sectional curvature
Little is known about the structure of positively curved manifolds. The soul theorem implies that a complete non-compact non-negatively curved manifold is diffeomorphic to a normal bundle over a compact non-negatively curved manifold. As for compact positively curved manifolds, there are two classical results:

 It follows from the Myers theorem that the fundamental group of such a manifold is finite.
 It follows from the Synge theorem that the fundamental group of such a manifold in even dimensions is 0, if orientable and  otherwise. In odd dimensions a positively curved manifold is always orientable.

Moreover, there are relatively few examples of compact positively curved manifolds, leaving a lot of conjectures (e.g., the Hopf conjecture on whether there is a metric of positive sectional curvature on ). The most typical way of constructing new examples is the following corollary from the O'Neill curvature formulas: if  is a Riemannian manifold admitting a free isometric action of a Lie group G, and M has positive sectional curvature on all 2-planes orthogonal to the orbits of G, then the manifold  with the quotient metric has positive sectional curvature. This fact allows one to construct the classical positively curved spaces, being spheres and projective spaces, as well as these examples :

 The Aloff–Wallach spaces .
 The Eschenburg spaces 
 The Bazaikin spaces , where .

Manifolds with non-negative sectional curvature

See also
Riemann curvature tensor
Curvature of Riemannian manifolds
Curvature
Holomorphic sectional curvature

References

.
 
.

 

 

Curvature (mathematics)
Riemannian geometry
Riemannian manifolds